Cyrtostachys elegans is a flowering plant species in the genus Cyrtostachys. It is endemic to New Guinea.

References

External links 

 International Plant Names Index

elegans
Plants described in 1937
Endemic flora of New Guinea
Taxa named by Max Burret